Barmby railway station was a station on the Hull and Barnsley Railway, and served the village of Barmby on the Marsh in the East Riding of Yorkshire, England.

References

External links
 Barmby station on navigable 1947 O.S. map

Disused railway stations in the East Riding of Yorkshire
Railway stations in Great Britain opened in 1885
Railway stations in Great Britain closed in 1932
Former Hull and Barnsley Railway stations